André Simon may refer to:

 André Simon (wine) (1877–1970), French London-based epicurean and wine writer
 André Simon (racing driver) (born 1920), racecar driver of 12 Grands Prix 1951-57